San Uk Pai is a village in Lam Tsuen, Tai Po District, Hong Kong.

Administration
San Uk Pai is a recognized village under the New Territories Small House Policy.

History
At the time of the 1911 census, the population of Uk Tau was 9. The number of males was 3.

References

Villages in Tai Po District, Hong Kong
Lam Tsuen